The 1950 Alabama gubernatorial election took place on November 7, 1950, to elect the governor of Alabama. Incumbent Democrat Jim Folsom was term-limited, and could not seek a second consecutive term.

Democratic primary
At the time this election took place, Alabama, as with most other southern states, was solidly Democratic, and the Republican Party had such diminished influence that the Democratic primary was the de facto contest for state offices.

Candidates
 William M. Beck
 Robert Bell
 Elbert Boozer, former Calhoun County Probate Judge and candidate for governor in 1946
 Bull Connor, Birmingham Commissioner of Public Safety and candidate for governor in 1938
 Jas. M. Dement
 Hugh Dubose
 W. R. Farnell
 Wiley Gordon
 Phil Hamm, Commissioner of the Department of Revenue
 J. Bruce Henderson, State Senator
 Joe Money
 Reuben Newton
 Gordon Persons, President of the Public Service Commission and candidate for governor in 1946
 Chauncey Sparks, former governor
 Albert Stapp

Results

Hamm withdrew from the primary runoff, meaning that Persons became the Democratic nominee.

Results

References

Alabama gubernatorial elections
1950 Alabama elections
Alabama
November 1950 events in the United States